Alien of extraordinary ability is an alien classification by United States Citizenship and Immigration Services. The United States may grant a priority visa to an alien who is able to demonstrate "extraordinary ability in the sciences, arts, education, business, or athletics" or through some other extraordinary career achievements. 

The immigrant version of the classification (EB-1A), which grants permanent residency, additionally requires the alien to demonstrate "sustained national or international acclaim", "achievements recognized by others in the field of expertise", and "a level of expertise indicating that the individual is one of that small percentage who have risen to the very top of the field of endeavor".  It has the important advantage that the petitioner can self sponsor rather than relying on an employer sponsor.  Depending on country of origin, this category may also allow one to bypass waiting lists of many years.

It is known colloquially as a "genius visa" or "artists' visa" (many of the recipients are artists).

It can be granted on immigrant or non-immigrant basis. The immigrant version is known as EB-1A (officially, E11 or E16 classification), and the non-immigrant version is known as O-1.

Distinction between EB-1A and O-1 

The immigrant version (EB-1A) is known to have a much more stringent standard than the non-immigrant version. In some cases an EB-1A petition may be filed on behalf of an alien who was previously granted the O-1, alien of extraordinary ability non-immigrant classification. Though the prior approval of an O-1 petition on behalf of the alien may be a relevant consideration in adjudicating the EB-1A petition, the adjudicator is not bound by the fact that the alien was previously accorded the O-1 classification if the facts do not support approval of the EB-1A petition; eligibility as an O-1 nonimmigrant does not automatically establish eligibility under the EB-1A criteria for extraordinary ability. Each petition is separate and independent and must be adjudicated on its own merits, under the corresponding statutory and regulatory provisions. Moreover, the O-1 non-immigrant classification includes different standards and criteria for aliens in the arts, athletics, and the motion picture industry. In such cases, there would be nothing inconsistent about finding that an alien in the arts has “distinction” according to the non-immigrant criteria, but not “national or international acclaim” according to the immigrant criteria.

Immigrant EB-1A visa (E11 / E16)

Description 

An alien meeting the extraordinary ability criteria may be eligible for an employment-based, first-preference EB-1 immigrant visa. An alien must be able to demonstrate extraordinary ability in the sciences, arts, education, business, or athletics through sustained national or international acclaim. Achievements must be recognized through extensive documentation. No offer of employment is required.

An alien must provide evidence of a one-time achievement (i.e., Pulitzer, Oscar, Olympic Medal), or meet 3 of 10 criteria below and demonstrate that he or she has:

 A level of expertise indicating that the individual is "one of that small percentage who have risen to the very top of the field of endeavor".
 Sustained national or international acclaim and that his or her achievements have been recognized in the field of expertise.

E11 classification and E16 classification are the same except E11 is issued for people currently living outside the United States, whereas E16 is issued to people who currently reside in the United States and would like to adjust their immigration status.

Eligibility criteria 

The alien must prove eligibility by meeting the requirement in a two-step analysis, according to a standard adopted by USCIS since 2010 (see Kazarian v. USCIS).

Part One: Initial Evidence 

In Part One, the alien must meet three out of the ten listed criteria below to prove extraordinary ability in the field:

 Evidence of receipt of lesser nationally or internationally recognized prizes or awards for excellence
 Evidence of membership in associations in the field, which demand outstanding achievement of their members
 Evidence of published material about you in professional or major trade publications or other major media 
 Evidence of judging the work of others, either individually or on a panel
 Evidence of original scientific, scholarly, artistic, athletic, or business-related contributions of major significance to the field
 Evidence of authorship of scholarly articles in professional or major trade publications or other major media 
 Evidence that work has been displayed at artistic exhibitions or showcases 
 Evidence of performance of a leading or critical role in distinguished organizations 
 Evidence that of high salary or other significantly high remuneration in relation to others in the field
 Evidence of commercial successes in the performing arts
In addition to the above, the regulations add the following flexibility: "If the above standards do not readily apply to the beneficiary's occupation, the petitioner may submit comparable evidence to establish the beneficiary's eligibility."

Part Two: Final Merits Determination 

Meeting the minimum requirement of providing evidence relating to at least three criteria does not, in itself, establish that the alien in fact meets the requirements for classification as an alien of extraordinary ability under section 203(b)(1)(A) of the INA. In making this determination, the court in Kazarian v. USCIS recognized that the quality of the evidence, such as whether the judging responsibilities were internal and whether the scholarly articles (if pertinent to the occupation) are cited, is an appropriate consideration in the final merits determination. In addition, the alien's performance at the so-called major-league level does not automatically establish that he or she meets the extraordinary ability standards. See Matter of Price, 20 I&N, Dec. 3241 citing to 56 FR 60899 (Nov. 29, 1991). Finally, Congress intended that in the absence of a one-time achievement, an alien could qualify for the classification based on a "career of acclaimed work." H.R. Rep. No. 101-723, 59 (Sept. 19, 1990).

In Part Two of the analysis in each case, the adjudicator must consider all of the evidence to make a final merits determination of whether or not the petitioner, by a preponderance of the evidence, has demonstrated that the alien has:

 A level of expertise indicating that the individual is "one of that small percentage who have risen to the very top of the field of endeavor." 8 CFR 204.5(h)(2); and

 Sustained national or international acclaim and that his or her achievements have been recognized in the field of expertise. 8 CFR 204.5(h)(3).

Advantages 

The EB-1A, unlike its non-immigrant counterpart, provides a pathway to citizenship.  Unlike most employment based pathways to citizenship, if someone can qualify as an EB-1A alien of extraordinary ability, that person can self sponsor without the need for their employer to sponsor them.  A green card can be granted on the basis of an EB-1A (but not an O-1) approval.  Once the green card is granted, the standard waiting period of five years--which applies to immigrants in many categories--is generally required before applying for citizenship.  However, by act of Congress, the waiting period was shortened to three years specifically for aliens of extraordinary ability who began the process before July 2002.  This allowed ice dancer Tanith Belbin to become a US citizen in time to compete in the 2006 Winter Olympics.

Appeals process 

Although the EB-1A application is an administrative process, a denial can be appealed through the US federal court system.  Another ice dancer, Christina Carreira, applied for EB-1A but was denied.  She appealed that denial through the US federal court system.  Carreira argued in the appeal that the criteria used in her case were unreasonable because they were so restrictive that, were they to be applied generally, they would allow no athletes at all to qualify as aliens of extraordinary ability.  Carreira hopes to compete for the US in the 2022 Winter Olympics.

Non-immigrant O-1 visa

Description 

The O1 nonimmigrant visa is for an alien who possesses extraordinary ability in the sciences, arts, education, business, or athletics, or who has a demonstrated record of extraordinary achievement in the motion picture or television industry and has been recognized nationally or internationally for those achievements.

Eligibility Criteria 
Eligibility Criteria for O-1A visa should include an evidence that the beneficiary has received a major award, such as a Nobel Prize, or evidence of at least three of the following:

 Receipt of nationally or internationally recognized prizes or awards
 Membership in associations in the field for which classification is sought which require outstanding achievements
 Published material in professional or major trade publications, newspapers or other major media 
 Original scientific, scholarly, or business-related contributions of major significance in the field
 Authorship of scholarly articles in professional journals or other major media 
 A high salary or other remuneration for services as evidenced by contracts
 Participation on a panel, or individually, as a judge of the work of others
 Employment in a critical or essential capacity for organizations and establishments, that have a distinguished reputation.

List of notable recipients

EB-1A (E11/E16) 
 Bettina May (b. 1979), pin-up model, burlesque dancer and photographer
 Dirk Nowitzki (b. 1978), basketball player
 Humberto Bruni Lamanna, Classical Guitar Concert Artist 
 Inon Barnatan, an Israeli Concert Pianist
 John Lennon
 Hassan Ben Sabbah Uriostegui
 Nordine Zouareg
 Tanith Belbin, Canadian-American ice dancer who used the EB-1A classification to obtain US citizenship in time to win a silver medal for the US at the 2006 Winter Olympics
 Yoko Ono
Melania Trump, a Slovene-American Former Model and Businesswoman, Former First Lady of United States of America from 2017 to 2021, during the presidency of her husband, Donald Trump.
 Akash Patel, President-elect at American Council on the Teaching of Foreign Languages, and founder of Happy World Foundation Inc.

O-1 
 Shera Bechard
 Justin Bieber
 Clive Crook
 Gavin Free
 Jolina Magdangal, a Filipina actress, recording artist, and concert performer
 Piers Morgan
 Gary Numan
 Pelé
 Psy
 Taron Egerton
 Mubarak Muyika, Silicon-valley based Entrepreneur known for founding his first company at 16 and selling it two years later in a six figure deal.

References 

United States visas by type